The Nehru–Gandhi family is an Indian political family that has occupied a prominent place in the politics of India. The involvement of the family has traditionally revolved around the Indian National Congress, as various members have traditionally led the party. Three members of the family–Jawaharlal Nehru, Indira Gandhi and Rajiv Gandhi–have served as the prime minister of India, while several others have been members of parliament (MP).

The Guardian wrote in 2007, "The Nehru brand has no peer in the world — a member of the family has been in charge of India for 40 of the 60 years since independence. The allure of India's first family blends the right to rule of British monarchy with the tragic glamour of America's Kennedy clan."

The Gandhi surname came from Feroze Gandhi, a politician of Gujarati Parsi ancestry, who  after joining the independence movement, changed the spelling of his surname from Ghandy to Gandhi, to match that of Mahatma Gandhi despite not being related biologically. Indira Priyadarshini Nehru, daughter of Jawaharlal Nehru, married Feroze Gandhi in 1942 and adopted his surname.

Family trees

Earliest record

Raj Kaul (late 1600s to early 1700s) a Kashmiri Pandit. He is the earliest recorded ancestor of the Nehru family. He is believed to have moved from Kashmir to Delhi in 1716 AD. A Jagir with a house situated on the banks of a canal was granted to Raj Kaul, and, from the fact of this residence, 'Nehru' (from Nahar, a canal) came to be attached to his name. Kaul was the original family name; this changed to Kaul-Nehru; and, in later years, Kaul was dropped out and the family name became only "Nehru".
During the early part of the 19th century, Gangadhar Nehru’s father, Lakshmi Narayan Nehru, worked as a clerk in Delhi for the East India Company.

First generation
 Gangadhar Nehru (1827–1861), a direct descendant of Raj Kaul. He was the last Kotwal of Delhi (equivalent to Chief of Police), prior to the Indian Rebellion of 1857. He was the father of freedom fighter Motilal Nehru and grandfather of Jawaharlal Nehru who was the first prime minister of India, thus part of the Nehru family.

Second generation
Bansi Dhar Nehru, Gangadhar's eldest son. He worked in the judicial department of the British Government and, after being appointed successively to various places, was partly cut off from the rest of the family.
Nandlal Nehru (1845–1887), older brother of Motilal Nehru. He was the Diwan (prime minister) of the princely state of Khetri in Rajputana.
Motilal Nehru (1861–1931), patriarch of Nehru–Gandhi family. He was a lawyer and a prominent leader of the Indian independence movement. He also served as the president of Congress twice, 1919–1920 and 1928–1929. 
Swarup Rani Nehru (1868–1938), played a prominent role in India's freedom movement in the 1920s–30s as an advocate of civil disobedience against the British Raj and its salt laws.

Third generation

Jawaharlal Nehru (1889–1964), son of Motilal Nehru. He was the first prime minister of India and was one of the most prominent leaders of the Indian independence movement. He had succeeded his father as president of the Congress in 1929.
Vijaya Lakshmi Pandit (1900–1990), eldest daughter of Motilal Nehru. She was an Indian diplomat and politician who later became the president of the United Nations General Assembly. Married Ranjit Sitaram Pandit in 1921.
Krishna Nehru Hutheesing (1907–1967) was an Indian writer, the youngest sister of Jawaharlal Nehru and Vijaya Lakshmi Pandit, and part of the Nehru–Gandhi family.
Kamala Nehru (1899–1936), wife of Jawaharlal Nehru. She was a prominent social reformer and was an active member of the All India Congress Committee.
Brijlal Nehru (1884–1964), son of Nandlal Nehru and a nephew of Motilal Nehru. He was the Finance Minister of the princely state of Jammu and Kashmir during the rule of Maharaja Hari Singh.
Rameshwari Nehru (1886–1966), wife of Brij Lal Nehru. She was a journalist and social worker who co-founded All India Women's Conference

Fourth generation
Indira Gandhi (1917–1984), only daughter of Jawaharlal Nehru. She became the first woman prime minister of India.
Feroze Gandhi (1912–1960), husband of Indira. He was a politician and journalist.
Braj Kumar Nehru (1909–2001), son of Brijlal Nehru. He served as the Indian diplomat and ambassador to the United States and as High Commissioner to the United Kingdom. He later served as Governor of several Indian states and was an adviser to his cousin Indira Gandhi.
Magdolna Nehru (1908–2017), nicknamed Fori, wife of Braj Kumar Nehru. 
Balwant Kumar Nehru (1916–1996), son of Brijlal Nehru and brother of Braj Kumar Nehru. Engineer and corporate manager who rose to become the deputy chairman of ITC and the president of the All-India Management Association.
Sarup Nehru, wife of Balwant Kumar Nehru.
Harsha Hutheesing (1935–1991) and Ajit Hutheesing (1936–2017), sons of Krishna Nehru Hutheesing and Raja Hutheesing
Chandralekha Mehta, the eldest of the three daughters born to Jawaharlal Nehru's sister, Vijaya Lakshmi Pandit
Nayantara Sahgal (born 10 May 1927), the second of the three daughters born to Vijaya Lakshmi Pandit
Rita Dar, the youngest of the three daughters born to Vijaya Lakshmi Pandit
Ratan Kumar Nehru (1902–1981), civil servant and diplomat, son of Mohanlal Nehru, grandson of Nandlal Nehru.

Fifth generation

Arun Nehru (1944–2013), great grandson of Nandlal Nehru. He was a politician and union minister during the 1980s.
Rajiv Gandhi (1944–1991), eldest son of Indira and Feroze Gandhi. He became the 6th prime minister of India after Indira's death.
Sanjay Gandhi (1946–1980), second son of Indira. He was also one of the most trusted lieutenants of his mother during the 1970s and was widely expected to succeed his mother as prime minister of India, but met with an untimely death in a plane crash.
Sonia Gandhi (née Maino 1946), widow of Rajiv Gandhi. She was born in Italy and took Indian citizenship, 11 years after marrying Rajiv Gandhi. She was the president of the Indian National Congress from 1998 to 2017 and has served as the Chairperson of the United Progressive Alliance since 2004. 
Maneka Gandhi (née Anand 1956), widow of Sanjay Gandhi. She is a noted environmentalist and animal welfare activist. She is a prominent member of the Bharatiya Janata Party.  She has served as a cabinet minister in four government. She also served as the Indian Union Cabinet Minister for Women & Child Development in the BJP led Government of 2014–19.
Subhadra Nehru, wife of Arun Nehru.
Sunil Nehru (born 1946), eldest son of Balwant Kumar Nehru. Engineer and corporate strategist, senior company executive at Max India, adventurer, scuba diver, and ardent trekker.
Neena Nehru (born 1946 née Neena Heble), wife of Sunil Nehru. Artist, poet, architect.
Nikhil Nehru (born 1948), second son of Balwant Kumar Nehru.  He had a stellar career in advertising, rising to become the president of McCann-Erickson and Chairman of Results International Group, India.
Samhita Nehru, wife of Nikhil Nehru.
Vikram Nehru (born 1952), third son of Balwant Kumar Nehru.  Entered the field of international development with a career at the World Bank. Became the World Bank's Chief Economist and Director for Poverty Reduction, Economic Management, Private and Financial Sector Development for East Asia and the Pacific. Subsequently, became the Chair in Southeast Asian Studies at the Carnegie Endowment for International Peace in Washington, D.C. and then Distinguished Practitioner-in-Residence at the Johns Hopkins University School of Advanced International Studies.

Sixth generation
Rahul Gandhi (born 1970), son of Rajiv Gandhi and Sonia Gandhi. He was the president  of the Congress party from 2017 and 2019, and was a member of Parliament from Amethi, UP from 2004 to 2019. He was the Chairman of the Congress coordination panel for 2014 Lok Sabha polls. He is currently the MP from Wayanad, Kerala in the Lok Sabha.
Priyanka Gandhi (born 1972), daughter of Rajiv Gandhi and Sonia Gandhi. She is the General Secretary of the Indian National Congress. Priyanka is married to Robert Vadra, a businessman.
Varun Gandhi (born 1980), son of Sanjay Gandhi and Maneka Gandhi. He is a member of the Bharatiya Janata Party, National Executive and the youngest National Secretary in the history of the party. He is a member of 2014 Lok Sabha, the lower house of Parliament of India, representing the Sultanpur constituency. 
 Yamini Gandhi, wife of Varun Gandhi.

Seventh generation
 Anasuya Gandhi (born 2020), daughter of Varun Gandhi and Yamini Gandhi.
 Raihan Vadra and Miraya Vadra—children of Priyanka Gandhi and Robert Vadra.

Gallery

See also
 List of political families

References

External links

 The making of the Ghandhi dynasty at The Guardian

 
Indian National Congress
People from Allahabad
Indian families
Parsi people
Hindu families
Political families of India
History of Allahabad